The 2014 Southeastern Conference football season began on August 28 with Texas A&M visiting South Carolina on the new SEC Network. This season will feature new inter-division rivalry games: Texas A&M-South Carolina and Arkansas-Missouri.

Preseason

Preseason All-SEC

Rankings

Regular season

All times Eastern time.  SEC teams in bold.

Rankings reflect those of the AP poll for that week until week 10 when CFP rankings are used.

Week One 

The game between Florida and Idaho did not kickoff until 9:50 p.m due to inclement weather.  The game was again delayed due to lightning after 10 seconds of play during which Florida returned the Idaho kickoff to the Idaho 14-yard line.  The game was called as "suspended" 40 minutes after the second delay.  Both schools' athletic directors decided on September 3 not to reschedule the game, thus declaring it a "no contest". Florida did agree to pay Idaho its promised fee of $975,000 and the schools agreed to schedule a game for the 2017 season.

Players of the week:

Week Two

Players of the week:

Week Three

Players of the week:

Week Four

Players of the week:

Week Five

Players of the week:

Week Six
{| class="wikitable" style="font-size:95%;"
! Date !! Time !! Visiting team !! Home team !! Site !! Broadcast !! Result !! Attendance !! class="unsortable"|Reference
|- bgcolor=
| October 4 || 12:00 p.m. || Florida || Tennessee || Neyland Stadium • Knoxville, Tennessee || SECN || FLA 10–9 || 102,455 ||
|- bgcolor=
| October 4 || 12:00 p.m. || #6 Texas A&M || #12 Mississippi State || Davis Wade Stadium • Starkville, Mississippi || ESPN || MISS ST 48–31 || 61,133 ||
|- bgcolor=
| October 4 || 3:30 p.m. || #3 Alabama || #11 Ole Miss || Vaught–Hemingway Stadium • Oxford MS || CBS || MISS 23–17 || 61,826 ||
|- bgcolor=
| October 4 || 4:00 p.m. || Vanderbilt || #13 Georgia || Sanford Stadium • Athens, Georgia || SECN || UGA 44–17 || 92,746 ||
|- bgcolor=
| October 4 || 7:00 p.m. || #15 LSU || #5 Auburn || Jordan–Hare Stadium • Auburn, Alabama || ESPN || AUB 41–7 || 87,451 ||
|- bgcolor=
| October 4 || 7:30 p.m. || South Carolina || Kentucky || Commonwealth Stadium • Lexington, Kentucky || SECN || UK 45–38 || 62,135 ||
|}

Players of the week:

Week Seven

Players of the week:

Week Eight

Players of the week:

Week Nine

Players of the week:

Week Ten

Players of the week:

Week Eleven

Players of the week:

Week Twelve

Players of the week:

Week Thirteen

Week Fourteen

SEC Championship Game

SEC vs Power Conference matchupsThis is a list of the power conference teams (ACC, Big 10, Big 12, Pac-12) the SEC plays in the non-conference (Rankings from the AP Poll):

Bowl games

(Rankings from final CFP Poll)

Awards and honors

All-SEC Teams

The Southeastern Conference coaches voted for the All-SEC teams after the regular season concluded.  Prior to the 2014 SEC Championship Game the teams were released. Alabama and Missouri placed the most representatives on the 2014 All-Southeastern Conference Coaches’ Football Team, the league office announced Tuesday. Both had seven total members, while Alabama had a league-leading five representatives on the first team. Twelve of the 14 SEC schools had a member on the first-team All-SEC squad.

Coaches were not permitted to vote for their own players.

National Awards
 Amari Cooper, Alabama – Heisman Trophy (finalist; finished 3rd)
 Amari Cooper, Alabama – Fred Biletnikoff Award (wide receiver)
 Reese Dismukes, Auburn – Dave Rimington Trophy (center)
 Dan Mullen, Mississippi State – Maxwell Coach of the Year
 Nick Saban, Alabama – Bobby Dodd Coach of the Year Award

All-AmericansWR – Amari Cooper, Alabama -- UNANIMOUS -- (AP, WCFF, TSN, AFCA, FWAA, USAT, CBS, ESPN, Scout, SI)OL – A. J. Cann, South Carolina  (TSN, CBS, ESPN)OL – Reese Dismukes, Auburn -- CONSENSUS -- (AP, WCFF, AFCA, FWAA, CBS, ESPN, Scout)OL – Arie Kouandjio, Alabama  (AFCA, USAT, SI)OL – Cedric Ogbuehi, Texas A&M  (WCFF, Scout)DL – Shane Ray, Missouri -- CONSENSUS -- (WCFF, TSN, AFCA, FWAA, USAT, CBS, Scout, SI)LB – Trey DePriest, Alabama  (AFCA)LB – Benardrick McKinney, Mississippi State  (FWAA, ESPN, SI)DB – Landon Collins, Alabama -- UNANIMOUS -- (AP, WCFF, TSN, AFCA, FWAA, CBS, ESPN, Scout, SI)DB – Senquez Golson, Ole Miss -- UNANIMOUS -- (AP, WCFF, TSN, AFCA, FWAA, USAT, CBS, ESPN, Scout, SI)DB – Vernon Hargreaves III, Florida  (TSN, CBS, ESPN)P – J. K. Scott, Alabama  (TSN, USAT, ESPN, SI)AP''' – Marcus Murphy, Missouri (Scout)

Home game attendance

Game played at Arkansas' secondary home stadium War Memorial Stadium, capacity: 53,955.

Attendance for SEC neutral-site games:

 68,113 for Texas A&M vs. Arkansas @ Arlington, Texas
 83,004 for Florida vs. Georgia @ Jacksonville

References